Trent Harris (born September 17, 1995) is an American football outside linebacker for the Houston Roughnecks of the XFL. He played college football for Miami. He signed with the New England Patriots as an undrafted free agent in 2018.

College career
Harris played four seasons for the Miami Hurricanes. He was named third team All-Atlantic Coast Conference as a senior after recording 37 tackles, 10.5 tackles for loss and had a team high 8.5 sacks. Harris finished his collegiate career with 126 tackles and 26 tackles for loss with 15 sacks, three passes defended, three fumble recoveries and one forced fumble.

Professional career

New England Patriots
Harris signed with the New England Patriots as an undrafted free agent on April 28, 2018. He was cut at the end of training camp but was re-signed to the Patriots practice squad on September 2, 2018. He spent the 2018 season on the Patriots practice squad and was cut the following season at the end of training camp.

Miami Dolphins
Harris was claimed off waivers by the Miami Dolphins on September 1, 2019. He made his NFL debut on September 22, 2019, against the Dallas Cowboys, making one tackle in a 31-6 loss.
In week 16 against the Cincinnati Bengals, Harris recorded a strip sack on Andy Dalton which was recovered by teammate Andrew Van Ginkel during the 38–35 overtime win.

On March 12, 2020, Harris was assigned a one-year, $585,000 tender by the Dolphins. He signed the tender on April 22, 2020. The Dolphins waived him on July 26, 2020. He was re-signed on August 25, 2020. He was waived on September 5, 2020.

New York Giants
On October 14, 2020, Harris was signed to the New York Giants practice squad. He was elevated to the active roster on October 17 and 22 for the team's weeks 6 and 7 games against the Washington Football Team and Philadelphia Eagles, and reverted to the practice squad after each game. He was promoted to the active roster on October 27. Harris was waived on December 8, 2020, and re-signed to the practice squad two days later. He signed a reserve/future contract on January 4, 2021.

On September 1, 2021, Harris was waived by the Giants and re-signed to the practice squad. On November 1, 2021 Harris was elevated from the practice squad for the game against the Kansas City Chiefs and on November 6, 2021, Harris was elevated for the second time this season for the game against the Las Vegas Raiders. On November 22, 2021, Harris was signed to the active roster. On December 3, 2021, Harris was placed on injured reserve. On December 30, 2021, Harris was waived. On January 10, 2022, Harris was signed to a reserve/future contract.

On May 18, 2022, Harris was waived.

Baltimore Ravens
On August 13, 2022, Harris signed with the Baltimore Ravens, but was placed on injured reserve three days later. He was released on August 25.

Las Vegas Raiders
On December 28, 2022, Harris was signed to the Las Vegas Raiders practice squad.

References

External links 
 Miami Hurricanes bio
 Miami Dolphins bio

1995 births
Living people
Players of American football from Florida
Sportspeople from Winter Park, Florida
American football defensive ends
Miami Hurricanes football players
New England Patriots players
Miami Dolphins players
New York Giants players
Baltimore Ravens players
Las Vegas Raiders players